Beloved may refer to:

Books

Beloved (novel), a 1987 novel by Toni Morrison
The Beloved (Faulkner novel), a 2012 novel by Australian author Annah Faulkner
Beloved, a 1993 historical romance about Zenobia, by Bertrice Small

Film
Beloved (1934 film), an American drama film directed by Victor Schertzinger
Beloved (1965 film), a Soviet romance film directed by Richard Viktorov
Beloved (1998 film), based on the Toni Morrison novel
Beloved (2011 film), a French film written and directed by Christophe Honoré
The Beloved (1940 film), a Soviet film directed by Ivan Pyryev
The Beloved, also known as Sin, a 1971 British film written and directed by George P. Cosmatos
The Beloved (1991 film), a Georgian film
The Beloved (2015 film), a Chinese film directed by Cao Dawei

Music

Bands
Beloved (band), an American post-hardcore band
The Beloved (band), a British electronic music group

Albums
Beloved (Dave East and Styles P album), a 2018 mixtape by Dave East with Styles P
Beloved (Glay album), 1996
Beloved (Jordan Feliz album), 2015
Beloved (Jewelry album), 2003
Beloved (I Killed the Prom Queen album), 2014
Beloved (Mesut Kurtis album), 2009
Beloved, a 2018 album by Snatam Kaur

Songs
"Beloved" (Jordan Feliz song), a song from the eponymous 2015 album
"Beloved" (Mumford & Sons song), a song from the 2018 album Delta
"Beloved" (Wendy Matthews song), a 1998 single from Wendy Matthews
"Beloved" (VNV Nation song), a song by VNV Nation from the 2002 album Futureperfect
"Beloved", a song by Ayumi Hamasaki's from the 2011 EP Five
"Beloved", a song by Leeland from the 2016 album Invisible
"Beloved", an art song by Rhea Silberta (1900–1959)
"Beloved", a song by Luscious Jackson from the 1999 album Electric Honey

People
 Charles VI of France (1368–1422), King of France
 Louis XV of France (1710–1774), King of France

Other uses
The Beloved (Rossetti painting), an 1865 oil painting by Dante Gabriel Rossetti
Beloved, the main antagonist of The Unicorn Chronicles book series

See also